K251 or K-251 may refer to:

K-251 (Kansas highway), a state highway in Kansas
K251BS, a radio station 
K251AU, a radio station
K.251 Divertimento No. 11 (Mozart) in D major (1776)